Solanum pachyandrum, known as , is a spine-forming vine of the Solanum genus (which contains over 1,000 species). It is native to southwestern Ecuador and northwestern Peru where the large juicy fruit is commonly eaten and considered a treat by children. Although the plant has been known and consumed by the indigenous people of that land, it was only published scientifically in 1914 by German botanist Friedrich August Georg Bitter.



Description

Bombona is a woody to subwoody vine growing 5+ m long that flowers from April to September in its native range in Ecuador and Peru. It differs from other related species by the presence of prickles on its pedicels (the stalks of individual flowers) and its ellipsoid, non-tapering anthers.

It's often said to be spiny, but is actually prickly since the spinose structures are not derived from leaves and lack vascular bundles inside, allowing them to more easily be removed.

Sympodial units plurifoliate (having many leaves or inflorescences) and do not geminate.

Leaves are pinnatifid (so deeply lobed as to appear pinnation) with four to six pairs of lobes. They are oblong and around twice as long as they are wide. Their texture is chartaceous (meaning they have a papery texture) and are glabrous on both surfaces. The midrib has recurved prickles and there are four to six major lateral veins on each side of the midrib that correspond to the lobes.

They are purple when immature and turn yellow-orange once mature. 

They are light brown in color, strongly flattened, and the surfaces are minutely pitted. The testal cells of the seeds are rectangular.

Taxonomy
Phylogenetic studies suggest it is likely part of a sister group to the rest of the prickly species belonging to the subgenus Leptostemonum called S. sect. Aculeigerum. Unlike most prickly species of Solanum, these species lack stellate hairs and are characterized by plurifoliate sympodial units, branched inflorescences, presence of prickles coupled with absence of stellate trichomes, and a vine-like habit.

The Solanum section Aculeigerum contains these eight species, all ranging in distribution from Mexico and Central America to Ecuador and Peru:
 Solanum alternatopinnatum Steud — juciri, jiquiri, or yuá-pará (Argentina, Brazil, and Paraguay in the wet forests of mata atlântica or "Selva Paranäense" at elevations from )
 S. bicorne Dunal — chilacayote, tomate de chichalaca, or toronjo (endemic to Mexico, in deciduous forests, grasslands, and humid montane forests at elevations from sea level to )
 Solanum cobanense J. L. Gentry (cloud forests of Honduras, Nicaragua, and Guatemala)
 Solanum pachyandrum Bitter — bombona (western slopes of the Andes and in the Huancabamba Depression of Ecuador (Manabí) and Peru (Cajamarca, La Libertad, and Tumbes) in moist forests on slopes)
 Solanum refractum Hook. & Arn. (Mexico, Guatemala, and Honduras in deciduous and semi-deciduous forests; from sea level to )
 Solanum triunfense S. Knapp — quistan (endemic to the Sierra Madre Occidental in the State of Chiapas, Mexico, in evergreen humid forests)
 Solanum wendlandii Hook. f. — kishtan,  (probably native from southern Mexico to Panama in wet and semi-deciduous forests. Cultivated worldwide in tropics and subtropics)

S. pachyandrum is differentiated from S. refractum by its white flowers and wider anthers and both are differentiated from the rest of the species by the fact that all filaments within a flower are of equal length.

References

External links

 Catalogue of Life
 Encyclopedia of Life
 GBIF
 Solanaceae Source
 World Flora Online

pachyandrum
Crops originating from Ecuador